Banque du Liban (English: Bank of Lebanon) is the central bank of Lebanon. It was established on August 1, 1963, and became fully operational on April 1, 1964. It is currently headed by Riad Salameh.

One of the main responsibilities of the bank is issuing Lebanon's currency, the Lebanese Pound. Other responsibilities include maintaining monetary stability, regulation of money transfers, and maintaining the soundness of the banking sector. Banking is a very important part of Lebanon's economy with over 100 different banks, which makes the role of BdL particularly important. It currently owns 99.37% of the shares of Lebanon's national carrier, Middle East Airlines. The BdL is also the dominant shareholder of the Intra Investment Company (IIC) which in turn owns 53% of Casino du Liban, making it the only central bank worldwide to rule over a Las Vegas-style gambling casino.

Besides the main branch in Beirut, it has branches in Aley, Baalbeck, Bikfaya, Jounieh, Nabatiye, Sidon, Tripoli, Tyre, and Zahlé.

Background

Ottoman domination of Lebanon, which lasted for more than four centuries, was brought to an end on October 6, 1918, with the entry of the Levant Marine Division into Beirut. The paper money issued by the Turkish Treasury, with a forced exchange rate, suffered the same fate.

In order to normalize economic life in the occupied territories and cover the expenses of the allied forces, British authorities imposed the banknotes of the National Bank of Egypt, the Egyptian currency having been, since October 30, 1916, closely linked to sterling and entirely covered by securities issued in sterling.

In accordance with the convention signed between the French and the British governments on September 15, 1919, a new occupying authority started to rule Lebanon. French troops replaced the British, under the command of General Gouraud, who was appointed on October 12, 1919, as "High-Commissioner of the French Republic in Syria and Cilicia, and Commander-in-Chief of the Levant Army". Consequently, the use of the Egyptian currency, suitable for the British Treasury, became inappropriate. To obtain Egyptian pounds, France, being the sole occupying power, had to offer increasing amounts of francs.

During World War I, the French franc had maintained its status thanks to advances from the British and American treasuries. However, in 1919, the French franc registered a drop because of the British government's decision to stop these advances, thus breaking the alliance between the franc, sterling and the dollar, and also because of the United States Government's decision to suspend its regulating role of the associated change rates. In order to replace the Egyptian pound, the French government decided, by Decree N° 129 issued by the High Commissioner on March 13, 1920, to endow Syria with a national currency.

On September 1, 1920, the representative of France proclaimed Great Lebanon. In 1920, the Banque de Syrie ("Bank of Syria"), which had been created for that purpose by the French-controlled Ottoman Bank, was granted the concession of issuing the Syrian currency, which became legal tender on May 1, 1920. Banknotes issued by this bank were reimbursable to the bearer or at sight by checks drawn on Paris, at the rate of FF 20 for £S 1 .

As a consequence, an independent, currency-issuing department was established at the Banque de Syrie. It was responsible for putting in circulation and withdrawing banknotes. Issuances were made either on behalf of the Treasury in Paris or on behalf of the Bank itself.

Concerning commercial operations, the Issuing Department was to provide the Banque de Syrie with banknotes only in exchange of foreign currencies or foreign securities, which constituted, together with the credits granted by the Treasury in Paris, the coverage of the currency in circulation. The Banque de Syrie's Issuing Department would later form the basis for the establishment of the Banque du Liban.

Role and function 

The Banque du Liban was established by the Code of Money and Credit promulgated on 1 August 1963, by decree no. 13513. It started to operate effectively on 1 April 1964. BDL is a legal public entity enjoying financial and administrative autonomy. It is not subject to the administrative and management rules and controls applicable to the public sector. Its capital is totally appropriated by the State.

Monetary policy 

A favorable environment has characterized the Lebanese economy in 2003. Lebanon is maintaining its commitment to exchange rate stability and to the soundness of its banking sector, in addition to implementing an ambitious fiscal adjustment program.

Confidence was boosted by the successful outcome of Paris-II conference, held in November 2002 with the participation of a number of countries and international organizations. An aggregate amount of US$4.3 billion was pledged in 15-year loans at reduced rates to support the government's economic reform plan for lowering the servicing cost of public debt, which accumulated over the years due to costly reconstruction efforts.

These developments led to a significant drop in TBs' interest rates, followed by a cut in commercial banks' average deposit and lending rates in Lebanese pound (LBP) and in foreign currencies. In parallel, USD holdings were being converted on a wide scale into LBP holdings. Moreover, the BOP performance, which started to improve in May 2002, remained on the same trend, with cumulative surpluses exceeding $2 billion at end-April 2003, while BDL assets in foreign currencies stood at more than $10 billion, excluding gold.

In the last few months, a strong demand emerged on Lebanese government paper in local and foreign currencies, due to increased confidence, reinforced in April by the Government's ability to pay from the Treasury a maturing $500 million Eurobond issue, without resorting to rollover as in the past. This was accompanied by a positive assessment by the IMF and major international rating agencies, which considered that Lebanon is on the right track in trying to end its economic and financial difficulties, and that its performance in coping with the aftermath of the war in Iraq is the best in the region.

In the banking sector, equity capital continued to increase, reaching $3.5 billion at end-April, and pushing the average capital adequacy ratio to 18%. Despite their modest growth, private sector loans attained 100% of GDP, a unique performance in itself. Deposits grew at an annual 11% rate, reaching $47 billion at end-April - more than double the GDP - with a dollarization rate dropping to 68%, from a 74% peak in May 2002. This excellent performance was buttressed by the BDL's efforts to strengthen prudential supervision, paving the way for compliance with Basle-II requirements by a sound banking sector, ready to better manage operational risks, and to improve transparency and good governance.

The government's commitment to decelerate the growth of public debt and to reduce its servicing cost was reflected in the conservative budgets of 2002 and 2003. Coupled with measures to achieve the highest possible proceeds from privatization and securitization, this strategy will be pursued over the medium term, expectedly leading to a public finance recovery.

The government has recently launched an ambitious 5-year economic reform program in hopes to cut the country's debt. The outcome of the reform program will largely be dependent on Banque du Liban.

Governing body 

The Banque du Liban is managed by the Governor who is assisted by four vice-governors, as well as by the Central Council.  By convention, the Governor of the Banque du Liban is always a Maronite Christian.

The Banque du Liban is managed by the Governor assisted by four vice-governors and the Central Council. The Governor is the legal representative of the Banque du Liban and has extensive authority over the management of the bank. He is entrusted with the enforcement of the Code of Money and Credit and the implementation of the Central Council's resolutions. Upon the proposal of the Minister of Finance, the Governor is appointed by decree sanctioned by the Council of Ministers, for a renewable six-year term. After the consultation with the Governor and upon the proposal of the Minister of Finance, the vice-governors are appointed by decree sanctioned by the Council of Ministers for a renewable five-year term. They assist the Governor in managing the bank, carrying out functions specified by the Governor, In addition, they assume their duties as members of the Central Council.

Governors
List of Governors of the Banque du Liban:

The Central Council

The Central Council sets the monetary and credit policies of the Bank, including money supply, and discount and lending rates. It discusses and decides, among other things, on issues concerning the banking and financial sectors, the establishment of clearinghouses, the issuing of currency and loan requests by public sector entities. The Council decides also on the rules and procedures that govern the staff and operations of the Bank, and on its annual budget and accounts. The members of the Central Council are:
The Governor, as chairman.
The four vice-governors.
The Director General of the Ministry of Finance, ex officio but strictly as member of the council.
The Director General of the Ministry of Economy and Trade, ex officio but strictly as a member of the council.

Capital Market Authority

The management of the Capital Markets Authority (CMA) is entrusted to a board formed of seven members and chaired by the Governor of Banque du Liban, the central bank of Lebanon. The board is composed of three full-time executive board members who are experts in capital markets, banking and financial affairs, and three part-time members representing ministries and other authorities directly involved in the work of the CMA: The Director General of the Ministry of Finance, the Director General of the Ministry of Economy and Trade and the Chairman of the Banking Control Commission.

The CMA Board has extensive powers that aim to enhance investor protection and promote investment in the financial markets. It has the power to establish general regulations concerning the establishment and management of stock exchanges, as well as regulations concerning the establishment and functioning of financial intermediation institutions which manage investment funds and collective investment schemes for the public. The CMA board is entrusted by Law 161/2011 to set the code of conduct for stock exchange institutions and their employees, as well as financial service providers and their employees. The CMA board has the power to regulate governance-related issues, such as the obligations of financial instrument issuers to publish and disclose to the public price-sensitive information. In the same context, the CMA board has the power to license the establishment and functioning of financial intermediation institutions, approve securitization activities, ratify (or cancel previous ratification of) the decisions taken by the administration of each stock exchange concerning the registration of securities and financial instruments; and approve the regulations set by the administrations of stock exchanges concerning the transactions undertaken on such stock exchanges.

Moreover, the CMA Board is mandated by law to issue consultations and opinion on draft laws and decrees related to the work and development of the capital markets in Lebanon.

The Special Investigation Commission 

The Special Investigation Commission (SIC) is a multi-function financial intelligence unit (FIU) with judicial status. It is the centerpiece of Lebanon's anti-money laundering (AML) and counter terrorist-finance (CFT) regime, a platform for international cooperation and plays a vital role in safeguarding concerned sectors from illicit proceeds. The SIC's tasks include receiving and analyzing suspicious transaction reports (STRs), conducting financial investigations, lifting banking secrecy, freezing accounts and/or transactions and forwarding them to concerned judicial authorities. With respect to terrorism and the financing of terrorism, the SIC is also empowered to prevent the use of movable or immovable assets. In addition to sharing ML / TF intelligence with counterparts and coordinating with foreign/local competent authorities on requests of assistance (ROAs), the SIC also proposes AML / CFT regulations and issues new regulations and recommendations to concerned parties. AML / CFT supervision via compliance examinations at banks and other reporting entities to ensure proper implementation of prevailing regulations is also among its tasks. The SIC is managed by the Governor Mr. Riad Salamé assisted by the president of the Banking Control Commission, a professional appointed by the Council of Ministers and the judge appointed to the Higher Banking Commission.

The Higher Banking Commission

The Higher Banking Commission was established at Banque du Liban in 1967, pursuant to Article 10 of Law No 28/67. It is composed of:
The Governor of the Banque du Liban, as Chairman
A vice-governor selected by the Central Council of the Banque du Liban
The Director General of the Ministry of Finance
A high-ranking judge, with a ten-year experience at least, approved by the Higher Judicial Council and appointed by decree;
A member of the Banking Control Commission, nominated by the Association of Banks in Lebanon
The chairman of the National Deposit Guarantee Institution (NDGI)

Investment policy for startups 
Aug. 22, 2013, Central Bank of Lebanon issued the new investment policy called "Circular No. 331". This aim to support Lebanon's knowledge economy by providing support to the thriving startup ecosystem. With this audacious move, Lebanon's Central Bank hopes to increase the country's GDP, decrease unemployment and position Lebanon as the tech hub of the Middle East.

The outcomes of the circular have however fallen short of the expectations. Many Lebanon's observers pointed that the initiative lacked transparency: There has been no clear indication of the number of start-up funded, jobs created and money spent. The initiative was unable to overcome a major hurdle of the Lebanese economy: banks' extremely risk adverse and conservative attitude towards investment.

Circular No. 331 encourages commercial banks to invest in start-ups. The BDL will guarantee up to 75% of the value of these commercial bank investments in the capital of start-ups that meet the determined criteria. Here are some of the start-ups that are innovative Lebanese companies working in the knowledge economy sector and have contribute to creating jobs.

 MEVP - is a Middle East-focused venture capital firm that invests in the early and growth stages of innovative companies run by talented entrepreneurs Walid Hanna and Walid Mansour primarily, but not exclusively, in the Middle East Region with a focus on the GCC and Levant markets.
 Berytech - a Lebanese tech focused business development center, has recently announced a $50 million investment fund, the Berytech Fund II. Berytech incubator is led by chairman Maroun Chammas.
 Leap Ventures - is a growth stage Venture Capital firm in the Middle East and North Africa, based out of Beirut and Dubai. Leap Ventures looks to make investments in innovation & technology startups from the MENA region that have reached the series B stage: startups that have established a market presence and are seeking to dramatically accelerate their global market penetration and commercialization. Leap Ventures is led by founding partners Henri Asselly and Hala Fadel.
 Presella - an event management technology startup with the primary focus on a paperless e-ticketing platform for the MENA region. The platform is supported by a Last minute ticket mobile application and an in-event door management application. APPS Currently in closed Beta in Dubai & Beirut.
 My ME - is a socially-responsible, personal travel planning service that helps guests design and implement trips to the Middle East and the Eastern Mediterranean based on their own travel dates, travel preferences, and personal style. My Middle East - prepares personalized travel plans to Egypt, Lebanon, Syria, Turkey, and Croatia (and soon other destinations).
 Kashida - is the first registered company in the world to transform the Arabic letterform into evocative, functional 3D design pieces. They offer contemporary home décor accents, furniture, corporate gifts and event souvenirs to create a more personalized living/work space for our B2B and B2C clients. 
 Egnyt Technology incubator managed by Samir Chreim. Egnyt recently opened 2,500-sqft business incubator in Beirut that is meant for enterprises focusing on technology.

According to the circular, the total participation of any bank in start-ups may not exceed 3% of the bank's capital, provided the participation of any bank in a single start-up does not exceed 10% of the aforementioned 3%. Thus, commercial banks must invest in at least 10 start-ups if they want to benefit from all the facilities provided to them by BDL.

The startup accelerator UK Lebanon Tech Hub is a startup initiative between Banque du Liban and the UK government.

Allegations of misconduct
In November 2020, The Wall Street Journal reported that the United States and other Western countries demanded a forensic audit of the Banque du Liban, as it was accused of money laundering, corruption and links to Hezbollah.

See also 

Banque Libano-Française S.A.L (BLF)
FFA Private Bank
Economy of Lebanon
List of Lebanese banks
Lebanese Pound
 Nasser Saidi, First Vice-Governor, 1993–1998 and 1998–2003

References

External links
Official site of Banque du Liban

.
Lebanon
 01
Banks established in 1963
1963 establishments in Lebanon
Business in Lebanon
Economy of Lebanon
Financial regulatory authorities of Lebanon